The women's high jump event at the 1997 European Athletics U23 Championships was held in Turku, Finland, on 10 and 12 July 1997.

Medalists

Results

Final
12 July

Qualifications
10 July
Qualify: first to 12 to the Final

Group A

Group B

Participation
According to an unofficial count, 15 athletes from 12 countries participated in the event.

 (1)
 (1)
 (1)
 (2)
 (1)
 (1)
 (2)
 (1)
 (1)
 (2)
 (1)
 (1)

References

High jump
High jump at the European Athletics U23 Championships